Kari Pekka Eloranta (born February 29, 1956) is a Finnish former professional ice hockey player who played over 20 years in numerous leagues throughout Europe and North America.  Among top-level leagues, he played with Reipas Lahti in the Finnish SM-liiga, Leksands IF, HV71 and Rögle BK in the Swedish Elitserien, the Calgary Flames and St. Louis Blues of the National Hockey League (NHL) and HC Lugano in Switzerland. Playing for HV71 during the 1985-1986 season, he was awarded Guldhjälmen.  Eloranta was a frequent member of the Finnish national team. In addition to the Canada Cup and World Championships, he was a three-time Olympian and was a member of Finland's silver medal-winning squad at the 1988 Winter Games.

Career statistics

Regular season and playoffs

International

References

External links 

1956 births
Living people
Calgary Flames players
Finnish ice hockey defencemen
HC Lugano players
HV71 players
Ice hockey players at the 1980 Winter Olympics
Ice hockey players at the 1988 Winter Olympics
Ice hockey players at the 1992 Winter Olympics
Ice hockey players with retired numbers
Leksands IF players
Oklahoma City Stars players
Olympic ice hockey players of Finland
Olympic medalists in ice hockey
Olympic silver medalists for Finland
Lahti Pelicans players
Rögle BK players
Sportspeople from Lahti
St. Louis Blues players
Undrafted National Hockey League players